Deo Brondo is a DR Congolese recording artist, composer, vocalist and entertainer. Brondo started music in Bozi Boziana's Anti Choc. Where he stayed from 1993 till 1997. After, he joined Zaïko Langa Langa where he composed the song Carpe Diem, in the 1999 album Poison. At one time, he was a member of the musical band Quartier Latin International, formed and led by Congolese musician Koffi Olomide. In the production Inchallah, Deo Brando is the sixth (last) person to sing his solo, behind Fally Ipupa, Bouro Mpela, Soleil Wanga, Montana Kamenga, and Jipson Butukondolo.

Discography
Deo Brondo Discography He wrote, arranged and was lead vocalist on Tous Pepele with Quartier Latin.

See also

References

Date of birth missing (living people)
Living people
People from Kinshasa
21st-century Democratic Republic of the Congo male singers
20th-century Democratic Republic of the Congo male singers
Democratic Republic of the Congo songwriters
Soukous musicians
Quartier Latin International
Year of birth missing (living people)